Penn Township is one of thirteen townships in St. Joseph County, in the U.S. state of Indiana. As of the 2000 census, its population was 64,322.

History
Penn Township was formed in 1832.

The Mishawaka Reservoir Caretaker's Residence was listed on the National Register of Historic Places in 1998.

Geography

Cities, towns, villages
 Mishawaka (partial)
 Osceola
 South Bend (partial)

Unincorporated towns
 Hi-View Addition at 
 Pleasant Valley at 
 Tamarack Grange at 
(This list is based on USGS data and may include former settlements.)

Adjacent townships
 Harris Township (north)
 Cleveland Township, Elkhart County (northeast)
 Baugo Township, Elkhart County (east)
 Olive Township, Elkhart County (southeast)
 Madison Township (south)
 Centre Township (west)
 Portage Township (west)
 Clay Township (northwest)

Cemeteries
The township contains these seven cemeteries: Chapel Hill Memorial Gardens, Eutzler, Fairview, Ferrisville, Pleasant Valley, Saint Josephs and Saint Josephs.

Major highways

Lakes
 Willow Lake

Education
 Penn-Harris-Madison School Corporation
 School City Of Mishawaka

Penn Township residents may obtain a free library card from any branch of the Mishawaka-Penn-Harris Public Library system.

Political districts
 Indiana's 2nd congressional district
 State House District 21
 State House District 5
 State House District 6
 State Senate District 10
 State Senate District 11
 State Senate District 9

References
 United States Census Bureau 2008 TIGER/Line Shapefiles
 United States Board on Geographic Names (GNIS)
 IndianaMap

External links
 Indiana Township Association
 United Township Association of Indiana

Townships in St. Joseph County, Indiana
South Bend – Mishawaka metropolitan area
1832 establishments in Indiana
Townships in Indiana